Romodanovsky District (Ramadanbuje; , Romodanovań ajmak) is an administrative and municipal district (raion), one of the twenty-two in the Republic of Mordovia, Russia. It is located in the eastern central part of the republic. Its administrative center is the rural locality (a settlement) of Romodanovo. As of the 2010 Census, the total population of the district was 20,702, with the population of Romodanovo accounting for 45.5% of that number.

Administrative and municipal status
Within the framework of administrative divisions, Romodanovsky District is one of the twenty-two in the republic. The district is divided into seventeen selsoviets which comprise forty-nine rural localities. As a municipal division, the district is incorporated as Romodanovsky Municipal District. Its seventeen selsoviets are incorporated into seventeen rural settlements within the municipal district. The settlement of Romodanovo serves as the administrative center of both the administrative and municipal district.

References

Notes

Sources

Districts of Mordovia
 
